Angelo Cruz Ramos is a Puerto Rican politician and the current mayor of Ceiba. Cruz is affiliated with the New Progressive Party (PNP) and has served as mayor since 2013. He has a master's degree in mathematics as a secondary education from the Interamerican University of Puerto Rico

References

Interamerican University of Puerto Rico alumni
Living people
Mayors of places in Puerto Rico
New Progressive Party (Puerto Rico) politicians
People from Ceiba, Puerto Rico
Year of birth missing (living people)
21st-century American politicians